Maksym Zinoviyovych Kozytskyy (born on 19 February 1981) is a Ukrainian entrepreneur, politician, and  Governor of Lviv Regional State Administration as of 5 February 2020.

Between 1998—2004, he studied to become a surgeon at Danylo Halytsky Lviv National Medical University.

In September 2007 Kozytskyy occupied different positions in energy companies such as Ukrnaftogazinvest LLC and Precarpathian Energy Company LLC. In October 2016 he took the position of CEO of Eco-Optima LLC.

Politics 

In 2015, Kozytskyy stood for election to the Lviv Regional Council for the political party «Self Reliance», but he was not accepted to the council. In the summer of 2019, he was a candidate for the position of the Governor of Lviv regional state administration (LRSA) together with Markiyan Malsky and Denys Shmyhal but did not get the position. However, in December 2019 Malsky announced his dismissal and Maksym Kozytskyy was approved by the Government of Ukraine for the position of the Governor of LRSA.

On February 5, 2020 the President of Ukraine Volodymyr Zelensky signed an order approve Maksym Kozytskyy as the Governor of Lviv Regional State Administration. At the same time, Kozytskyy became the chief of Lviv Regional Organization of the political party Servant of the People.

In October 2020 Kozytskyy was the first in the party list of Servant of the People at the elections to the Lviv Regional Council and the party obtained 9 seats, thus, becoming second major party in the Lviv regional council.

References

External links 
 
 

1981 births
Living people
Businesspeople from Lviv
Governors of Lviv Oblast
Danylo Halytsky Lviv National Medical University alumni
National University of Kyiv-Mohyla Academy alumni
University of Lviv alumni
Self Reliance (political party) politicians
Servant of the People (political party) politicians
21st-century Ukrainian businesspeople
21st-century Ukrainian politicians
Politicians from Lviv